Joaquín Tellechea was an hacendado and Spanish Army sergeant major who served as the 17th mayor of Ponce, Puerto Rico, in 1821. Tellechea was a sergeant major and also owned a 90-cuerda sugar cane hacienda in the Los Caños sector in Ponce.

Introduction to politics
Tellechea was church clerk (Secretario parroquial) at the time the first constitutional mayor and municipal council were instituted in Ponce in 1812 as a result of the Spanish Constitution of 1812. He recorded the minutes of the first municipal council meeting while a council clerk was voted on and put in place. By the end of that same council meeting, held on 18 October 1812, Tellechea was himself elected council clerk. He was confirmed at the next meeting, held on 26 October 1812, and by the following meeting (2 November 1812) he was already signing the official record of the meetings for historical preservation and archiving.

Mayoral term
Tellechea is remembered because, in late 1820, he altered the elections results for the mayoral post in his favor so that he, and not the other candidate for the post —Jose Casimiro Ortiz de la Renta—would appear elected for the job. As a result, he was suspended from serving; he was not allowed to stay on even as a regular member of the municipal council. Instead, Salvador Blanch won the municipal mayor seat. Tellechea subsequently fled ("se marcho a Tierra Firme") and was never heard of again. On 16 December 1821, Blanch was finally elected mayor but, it turns out, he was not able to accept the position because of conflicts with his work as harbourmaster.

See also

 List of Puerto Ricans
 List of mayors of Ponce, Puerto Rico

Notes

References

1760s births
1840s deaths
Year of birth uncertain
Year of death uncertain
Mayors of Ponce, Puerto Rico